Belle Haven is a census-designated place (CDP) in Fairfax County, Virginia, United States. Nearby CDPs are Huntington (northwest), Groveton (southwest) and Fort Hunt (south). The population of Belle Haven was 6,518 at the 2010 census.

The CDP is located just south of Old Town Alexandria and bounded on the west by Richmond Highway (U.S. 1) and on the east by the Potomac River. It encompasses Belle Haven, a wealthy subdivision dating from the 1920s, and several adjoining neighborhoods. Some, particularly New Alexandria and Belle View, are among the lowest-lying residential areas of Fairfax County, and sustained extensive flood damage from storms including 2003's Hurricane Isabel and 1972's Hurricane Agnes. The Belleview branch of the Alexandria Post Office is located here, and serves the 22307 ZIP code in which the majority of the CDP falls.

History
The name "Belle Haven" derives from when Scottish pioneers settled along the Potomac River in the early 18th century. They named the settlement after their favorite countryman, the Earl of Belhaven. This early settlement thrived along the Potomac River as a port and was later renamed "Alexandria". The area later became part of the West Grove Plantation, which was built by Hugh West around 1748. It capitalized on its close and favorable position to the newly forming town of Alexandria.

The West family was important in Virginia and Fairfax County politics in the 18th century. Hugh West himself was a burgess from Fairfax County, a vestryman, and a trustee of the town of Alexandria. His son, John, followed in his father's footsteps with continued public work until he died in 1777.

The home passed from the West family in 1814 to a Col. Augustine J. Smith, who bought the plantation from the last West, James, who died in 1814. This included the draining of the swamps along the Potomac River and building a dike. This increased his land holding considerably, but the embankments were cut after his death and never repaired. He is also known for his vast building spree, where he had no less than thirteen new buildings built for the much enlarged plantation. These included larger slave quarters for the forty slaves he owned.

Smith died in 1830, and after several years the plantation was sold to Dennis Johnston. He did little enlarging to the plantation, still known as West's Grove. He was probably kept busy repairing all of Smith's additions. Johnston died several years before the Civil War, and his widow ran the plantation in his place. In 1862 the 39th New York Volunteer Infantry Regiment (Garibaldi Guard) occupied the plantation and later burned it to the ground, retaliating against the owner's sons for serving as officers on General Robert E. Lee's staff. No house occupied this land again until the first house was built in Belle Haven at 6041 Woodmont Road in 1928.

The current Belle Haven residential community had its start in the 1920s when David Howell, a civil engineer from Alexandria, purchased the land from owners Mrs. Thomas Wilfred Robinson, Sr. and her brothers. Upon purchasing the land, Howell set up two corporations, one to construct a golf course and club, and the other to develop a residential subdivision. The golf course and club later became the Belle Haven Country Club, which still exists.

Geography
Belle Haven is located in eastern Fairfax County at  (38.779013, −77.060721). The eastern border of the community is in the Potomac River and is the state border with Maryland. The northern border follows tidal Hunting Creek and is with the city of Alexandria.

Belle Haven is located 20 minutes outside of Washington, D.C.

Demographics
As of the census of 2000, there were 6,269 people, 3,116 households, and 1,570 families residing in the CDP. The racial makeup of the CDP was 86.17% White, 6.88% African American, 0.26% Native American, 2.27% Asian, 0.06% Pacific Islander, 1.93% from other races, and 2.44% from two or more races. Hispanic or Latino of any race were 5.47% of the population.

There were 3,116 households, out of which 19.5% had children under the age of 18 living with them, 40.7% were married couples living together, 7.5% had a female householder with no husband present, and 49.6% were non-families. 41.8% of all households were made up of individuals, and 9.6% had someone living alone who was 65 years of age or older. The average household size was 2.01, and the average family size was 2.77.

In the CDP, the population was spread out, with 17.2% under the age of 18, 4.1% from 18 to 24, 35.0% from 25 to 44, 28.8% from 45 to 64, and 14.9% who were 65 years of age or older. The median age was 41 years. For every 100 females, there were 87.3 males. For every 100 females age 18 and over, there were 83.5 males.

The median income for a household in the CDP was $65,262, and the median income for a family was $92,195. Males had a median income of $55,446 versus $42,485 for females. The per capita income for the CDP was $46,483. About 3.3% of families and 5.0% of the population were below the poverty line, including 4.7% of those under age 18 and 3.4% of those age 65 or over.

Population history of Belle Haven CDP from the U.S. Census Bureau 
1980...6,520
1990...6,427
2000...6,269
2010...6,518

Gallery

References

Census-designated places in Virginia
Census-designated places in Fairfax County, Virginia
Virginia populated places on the Potomac River
Washington metropolitan area
1928 establishments in Virginia